Jones College may refer to:

 Jones College (Rice University), one of eleven residential colleges of Rice University in Houston, Texas
 Jones College (Jacksonville), a college in Jacksonville, Florida
 Jones County Junior College, a community college in Mississippi
Jones College, the former name of a college in Denver renamed in 1998 to Kaplan University